Doctors is a British medical soap opera which began broadcasting on BBC One on 26 March 2000. Set in the fictional West Midlands town of Letherbridge, the soap follows the lives of the staff and patients of the Mill Health Centre, a fictional NHS doctor's surgery, as well as its sister surgery located at a nearby university campus. The following is a list of characters that first appeared in Doctors in 2007 and 2008, by order of first appearance. All characters are introduced by the programme's executive producer, Will Trotter. Vivien March (Anita Carey) was introduced in May 2007, as well as Vera Corrigan (Doña Croll). July 2007 saw the arrival of both Daniel Granger (Matthew Chambers) and Melody Bell (Elizabeth Bower). Archie Hallam (Matt Kennard) and Eva Moore (Angela Lonsdale) were introduced August and October 2007, respectively. Selina Chilton made her debut as Ruth Pearce in April 2008.

Vivien March

Vivien March, portrayed by Anita Carey, first appeared on 17 May 2007 and made her final appearance on 20 March 2009. A former matron until her mother falls ill, Vivian then looks after her until her death. She becomes a Mill receptionist. When Vivien wants to start driving again because she is fed up with using buses, she persuades Jimmi Clay (Adrian Lewis Morgan) to help her choose a car at an auction. Vivien gets several people from the surgery to teach how her to drive, but they all get fed up with her, so she turns to Jimmi again, who helps her to pass. On 16 June 2008, Vivien's house is broken into by two young men, one of whom, Ryan Parker (Richard Clarke), rapes her. On 7 July, Vivien reveals to Jimmi that she has been raped, and tells him not to tell anyone as she is ashamed. Jimmi offers to let her stay at his house, but she turns him down. Jimmi suggests that he could tell his girlfriend Eva Moore (Angela Lonsdale) about what has happened, but Vivien is adamant she does not want the police involved. Vivien later discovers another victim of the pair, which prompts her to become a witness for the prosecution in their trial, on 18 November 2008. However, after feeling the pressure of being a witness in court, she feels that she cannot cope with the line of questioning and refuses to continue. Vivien's final regular appearance is in the 20 March 2009 episode, when she decides she wants to be with her ex-boyfriend in Bermuda. She is seen a week later on a DVD message to George (Stirling Gallacher) and Ronnie Woodson (Seán Gleeson), saying that she is enjoying Bermuda and passes her best wishes to them both.

After the storyline which saw Vivien getting raped, Anita Carey received the award for Best Female Dramatic Performance at the 2009 British Soap Awards. The storyline also won Best Storyline, and the episode in which she confessed the rape to Jimmi won Best Episode. In 2018, the storyline was once again recognised at the British Soap Awards, being nominated for Greatest Moment.

Vera Corrigan
Vera Corrigan (also Wallis), portrayed by Doña Croll, first appeared on 10 May 2007 and made her last appearance on 14 June 2007. Croll reprised her role in 2010, making one appearance in January, and another in August. Vera and Tony Corrigan (Ian Blower) are the parents of Michelle Corrigan (Donnaleigh Bailey), who becomes a nurse at The Mill in 2006. Tony dies on their 30th wedding anniversary in 2007, so Vera left Letherbridge a few later. When she returned in January 2010, she began suffering from pains. Michelle thinks it is cancer but does not want to believe it, especially after Vera's mother, Diane, died of cancer. Michelle asks colleagues Heston Carter (Owen Brenman) and Lily Hassan (Seeta Indrani) for their medical opinion, to which they both say it could be cancer. Vera was set to have results from St. Phil's hospital that day and Michelle went with her, where it was discovered it was not cancer, but just general pains.

Daniel Granger

Dr. Daniel Granger, portrayed by Matthew Chambers, was introduced as a general practitioner at the Mill on 9 July 2007. His storylines in the programme have included his on-off relationship with Zara Carmichael (Elisabeth Dermot Walsh), becoming a father, briefly going to prison and becoming a partner at the Mill. For his portrayal of Daniel, Chambers has been nominated for a variety of awards, including Best Daytime Star at the Inside Soap Awards, and Best Actor at The British Soap Awards.

Melody Bell
Dr. Melody Bell, portrayed by Elizabeth Bower, first appeared on 31 July 2007 and made her final appearance on 4 June 2009. Melody arrives at The Mill as the new GP Registrar. Her friend and colleague Ruth Pearce (Selina Chilton) is suffering from a nervous breakdown, so she refers Ruth to a mental health facility, where she is later sectioned under the Mental Health Act. Melody then has to assess Ruth to see if she was well enough to come back to work, and Ruth passes the assessment. When Melody is on a call overnight, she is held hostage alongside a patient giving birth. Upon her escape, Melody confirms acceptance of a new job, and she departs from The Mill.

Bower was longlisted for Sexiest Female at the 2009 British Soap Awards.

Archie Hallam
Archie Hallam, portrayed by Matt Kennard, first appeared on 21 August 2007 and made his last appearance was on 27 April 2009. Archie is a good friend of Michelle Corrigan (Donnaleigh Bailey), and she helps Archie to get his job at The Mill. In January 2008, he starts a relationship with Melody Bell (Elizabeth Bower), but the pair split up with her after he told the police about her brother dealing drugs from her apartment. In 2009, Archie finds out information regarding the Trelawney Wells Drug Trials along with his girlfriend, and he is suspended from The Mill by Julia Parsons (Diane Keen).

Kennard was longlisted for Sexiest Male at the 2009 British Soap Awards.

Eva Moore
DI Eva Moore, portrayed by Angela Lonsdale, made her first appearance on 18 October 2007. Eva left on 21 October 2008 to enter witness protection, but she returned for a brief stint in September 2011. Eva is the girlfriend of Jimmi Clay (Adrian Lewis Morgan), and is a Detective Inspector with Letherbridge Police. She becomes pregnant with Jimmi's baby, but soon miscarries and the pair separate afterwards. Months later, they get back together. In October 2008, she is shot by criminals who persistently cause trouble for her. She returns to Letherbridge on 9 September 2011 at The Mill and meets up with Jimmi, but realises he had moved on.

Ruth Pearce

Ruth Pearce, portrayed by Selina Chilton, first appeared on 18 April 2008 and made her final appearance on 4 January 2011. Ruth was introduced as a shy receptionist who works at the Campus Surgery. Julia Parsons (Diane Keen) is impressed by Ruth's abilities since several staff members at the Campus had quit, leaving Ruth to juggle all of the responsibilities. She asks Ruth to join her team at the Mill, to which Ruth accepts. Writers formed a friendship between Ruth and nurse Michelle Corrigan (Donnaleigh Bailey). Under Michelle's guidance, Ruth gains confidence and she eventually comes out of her shell. Ruth suffers from mental illness and has a mental breakdown, but Michelle cannot accept the fact she is ill. Bailey admitted that her character could have handled the situation better, but due to the death of her father and Ruth betraying as a result of her mental state, she felt Michelle's reaction was justified.

For her portrayal of Ruth, Chilton received a longlist nomination for the British Soap Award for Best Actress. She was also shortlisted for the Best Newcomer award. For her part in the mental health storyline, Chilton won the Acting Performance award at the RTS Midlands Awards, and got nominated for Most Popular Newcomer at the National Television Awards. She received another Best Actress nomination at the British Soap Awards in 2010, as well as being nominated for Best Daytime Star at the Inside Soap Awards. Paul Daverson, a mental health nurse, was impressed with how accurately Doctors covered Ruth's psychotic breakdown. He praised the writers for creating a brave depiction since it aired in the 2000s, a time he felt it was rare for mental health to be portrayed correctly.

References

Doctors
Doctors
2007
, Doctors
, Doctors